The 2021 Texas A&M–Commerce Lions football team represented Texas A&M University–Commerce as a member of the Lone Star Conference (LSC) during the 2021 NCAA Division II football season. Led by third-year head coach David Bailiff, the Lions compiled an overall record of 7–4 with a mark of 5–2 in conference play, tying for second place in the LSC. Texas A&M–Commerce played their home games at Memorial Stadium in Commerce, Texas.

The 2021 season was the last that the Lions competed in the Lone Star Conference. In 2022, the program will move to NCAA Division I Football Championship Subdivision play and compete in the Southland Conference.

Previous season
The Lions finished the 2019 season with an overall record of 10–3 and a mark of 7–1 in Lone Star Conference (LSC) play, to placing second in the conference standings. On August 12, 2020, the Lone Star Conference postponed fall competition in 2020 for several sports due to the COVID-19 pandemic. Two weeks later, Texas A&M–Commerce announced that they would out the football program in competing in the 2020–21 academic year.

Schedule
Texas A&M–Commerce announced their 2021 football schedule on March 24, 2021.

Rankings

References

Texas AandM-Commerce
Texas A&M–Commerce Lions football seasons
Texas AandM-Commerce Lions football